Arthur Twidle (?1865 to 26 April 1936) was an English illustrator and artist best known for his illustrations of Arthur Conan Doyle's Sherlock Holmes books.

Born in Rotherhithe, Surrey, in 1865, Arthur Twidle was the son of Alfred Twidle (a journeyman cooper and his wife Rachel (née Smith), who had married in 1855.  In 1881, following the death of his mother, Twidle was living with an uncle and his occupation was described as draughtsman in wood.

In 1885, Twidle married Annie Elizabeth Mason at St. Olave, Southwark. In  1891, the family—now including Annie Elizabeth (b. 1887) and Arthur (b. 1888) -- were living in Dulwich.

On the death of Sidney Paget, who had illustrated Conan Dolyle's Sherlock Holmes stories in The Strand magazine, Twidle became one of Doyle's regular artists. He  illustrated many of Doyles's later works  including  the Doyle  'Author's Edition'. Over many years, Twidle's illustrations appeared in Annie S. Swan's Magazine, The Strand, The Red Magazine, the Girl's Own Paper, and elsewhere. He was a prolific illustrator for the Boy's Own Paper, particularly of historical subjects. He also illustrated for the Religious Tract Society and Frederick Warne & Co.

According to a brief obituary in The Times, "Mr. Twiddle did most of his work in black-and-white and water-colour. He exhibited paintings in oils at the Royal Academy and was well known for his mural paintings, panels and pastels."

External links
 
Arthur Twidle

English illustrators
19th-century English painters
English male painters
20th-century English painters
People from Rotherhithe
1865 births
1936 deaths
19th-century English male artists
20th-century English male artists